Annalisa Durante (February 19, 1990 – March 27, 2004) was a 14-year-old Italian girl and a victim of the Camorra, the Neapolitan Mafia. She was killed in the Forcella quarter of Naples, during a clash between two rival Camorra clans. While chatting with a friend and cousin outside her home, she was shot in the back of the head by Salvatore Giuliano, who was engaged in a shooting by the Bove-Mazzarella clan. She died after being in a coma for several days.

The local priest accused the state of leaving the neighbourhood to the mercy of the Camorra. A message on a bouquet of flowers left on the street where Annalisa was shot appeared to speak for many in the neighbourhood: "Free us from these monsters, Goodbye Annalisa."  Thousands turned out for the emotionally charged funeral. Many mourners were in tears as they packed a parish church to pay tribute to Annalisa.

Salvatore Giuliano, a member of the Giuliano clan who once controlled the Forcella neighbourhood, was arrested on March 30, 2004. In March 2006, he received a 24-year jail sentence for the killing.

Diary

In 2005, her diary was published in Italian:
Andolfo, Matilde (2005). Il diario di Annalisa, Naples: Tullio Pironti

See also
Gomorrah, book about the Camorra

References

External links
 Various documents pertaining to the Annalisa Durante homicide

1990 births
2004 deaths
People from Naples
People murdered by the Camorra
People murdered in Calabria
Murdered Italian children
Italian murder victims